Janusz Jędrzejewicz (21 June 1885 – 16  March 1951) was a Polish politician and educator, a leader of the Sanacja political group, and 24th Prime Minister of Poland from 1933 to 1934.

Life
He joined Józef Piłsudski's Polish Socialist Party in 1904. After World War I broke out, he joined the Polish Legions and the Polish Military Organization. In 1918 he joined the Polish Army and served as aide to Piłsudski. In 1919, he was transferred to Section II (Intelligence) at the Lithuanian-Belarusian Front Headquarters, and later to the General Staff.

After the Polish–Soviet War, in 1923 Jędrzejewicz became a politician. He was elected a deputy to the Polish Sejm (1928–35) and later a senator. In 1930–1935 he was vice-president of the Nonpartisan Bloc for Cooperation with the Government (BBWR). From 12 August 1931, to 22 February 1934, he served as minister of education. He introduced a reform of Poland's educational system that came to be named, after him, "Jędrzejewicz reform."  From 10 May 1933, to 13 May 1934, he was Prime Minister of Poland.

In 1926, he founded the monthly, Wiedza i Życie. In 1929, he organized a teachers' union, Zrąb, and other educational societies, including the Polish Academy of Literature. He was also co-author of the 1935 Polish Constitution. After Piłsudski's death in 1935, he opposed the Camp of National Unity (OZN, Ozon) and the right wing of the Sanacja movement, and retired from political life.

After the Soviet invasion during the Polish Defensive War of 1939, he fled to Romania and later through Palestine to London. In 1948, he was chosen to be head of Liga Niepodległości Polski, a political party in exile. He died in 1951.

He was a brother of Wacław Jędrzejewicz and married Cezaria Baudouin de Courtenay Ehrenkreutz Jędrzejewiczowa, a pioneer of ethnography in Poland.

Honours and awards
Silver Cross of Virtuti Militari
Cross of Independence with Swords
Cross of Valour – twice
Order of Polonia Restituta
Order of the Cross of the Eagle, First Class (Estonia, 1938)

See also
 Prometheism

References
 "Jędrzejewicz, Janusz," Encyklopedia Polski, p. 256.

1885 births
1951 deaths
People from Vinnytsia Oblast
People from Berdichevsky Uyezd
People from the Russian Empire of Polish descent
Polish Socialist Party politicians
Nonpartisan Bloc for Cooperation with the Government politicians
Prime Ministers of Poland
Education ministers of Poland
Government ministers of Poland
Members of the Sejm of the Second Polish Republic (1928–1930)
Members of the Sejm of the Second Polish Republic (1930–1935)
Senators of the Second Polish Republic (1935–1938)
Polish exiles
Polish legionnaires (World War I)
Recipients of the Silver Cross of the Virtuti Militari
Recipients of the Order of Polonia Restituta
Recipients of the Cross of Independence with Swords
Recipients of the Cross of Valour (Poland)
Recipients of the Military Order of the Cross of the Eagle, Class I